Ang Totoong Buhay ni Pacita M. is a 1991 Metro Manila Film Festival entry that tells the story of a singer-entertainer Pacita M. ( Nora Aunor) in a seedy Quezon City nightclub.

Cast
Nora Aunor as Pacita M.
Lotlot de Leon as Grace
Armida Siguion-Reyna as Mrs. Estrella
Marissa Delgado 
Juan Rodrigo

Awards and recognition

List of Film Festival Competed or Exhibited
1992 - Honolulu  Film Festival
1992 - Singapore Film Festival

References

External links
 

Philippine drama films
Films set in the Philippines
1991 films
Filipino-language films
Films set in nightclubs